The Solano County Superior Court is the California superior court with jurisdiction over Solano County.

Historical Summary 
The California Constitution of 1849 laid the framework for the judicial system. In Solano County, prior to the establishment of the superior court, there was a County Court and Court of Sessions. The judicial officers, all of whom were elected to office, included the County Judge and the Justices of the Peace. The first County Judge was Joseph Winston (1850) and the last John M. Gregory (who served intermittently from 1873–1884). Solano’s first superior court judge Abraham Jay Buckles ascended to the bench in 1885. Solano County still possessed municipal courts despite the establishment of the superior court. By 1987, there was the Solano County Superior Court, Vallejo Municipal Court District, and Northern Solano Judicial District (which comprised the Fairfield-Suisun-Vacaville Judicial and the Dixon Judicial Districts). Following the passing of Proposition 220 (1998), Solano’s municipal courts were consolidated with the superior court.

Courthouses

Fairfield

Hall of Justice 

Established in 1970, the Hall of Justice is located at 600 Union Avenue in Fairfield, California. Its Neoclassical building (built in 1914) is the former site of Armijo High School. By 1976, a connecting wing was constructed to accommodate more courtrooms and county and court departments. The Family Law/Adoption/Probate Division, Family Law Facilitator, Criminal/Traffic Division, Juvenile Division, Solano County Law Library, eleven courtrooms that mainly hear family or probate law cases, and other departments are located in the Hall of Justice.

Law and Justice Center 
The Law and Justice Center is located at 530 Union Avenue in Fairfield, California. The building, constructed by Hellmuth, Obata & Kassabaum, was established in 1989. The Sheriff's Office and six courtrooms that mainly hear criminal cases are located in the Law and Justice Center.

Old Solano Courthouse 

The Old Solano Courthouse is located at 580 Texas Street in Fairfield, California. The Beaux-Arts building, designed by architect E.C. Hemmings, was originally built in 1911 and functioned as a courthouse until 1970 when the Hall of Justice was officially opened. The building then housed several county offices until the Solano County Government Center was constructed in 2005. Henceforth, the building remained vacant until undergoing a series of renovations beginning in 2013. The Old Solano Courthouse was officially opened in 2014. The Civil/Small Claims Division, Civil Mediation Center, and three courtrooms that mainly hear civil cases are located in the Old Solano Courthouse.

Vallejo

Solano Justice Center 
The Solano Justice Center, constructed by Beland Gianelli and Associates and Lillis and Cooper in the early 1970s, is located at 321 Tuolumne Street in Vallejo, California. The Criminal/Traffic Division, four courtrooms that mainly hear criminal cases, and other court departments are located in the Solano Justice Center.

Court Executive Officers (1998–present) 
In Solano County, prior to the consolidation of the municipal and superior courts, there was the Municipal Court Executive Officer who was appointed by the Presiding Judge with the majority of the judges of the court. After the consolidation, the position was henceforth referred to as the Court Executive Officer. California Rule of Court 10.610 states that the Court Executive Officer is responsible for personnel, budgetary, contractual and technological matters, as well as calendar management and jury management. As of 1998, the following Court Executive Officers have served Solano County Superior Court:

 Charles E. Ramey (Municipal Court Executive Officer: 1987–1997; Court Executive Officer: 1998–2005) 
 Linda G. Ashcraft (2005–2007)
 Brian K. Taylor (2007–present)

Judicial Officers (Current) 
Initially, upon the creation of Solano County Superior Court in 1884, there was only one superior court judge. Beginning in 1943 (Stats. 1943, ch. 628), the number of judges began to steadily increase. By 1985, California law at the time allowed for Solano County to have 5 superior court judges and 3 municipal court judges. With the passing of Assembly Bill 511 (1985), the number of judges increased to 7 and 4 respectively. The next significant trend in the number of judicial officers occurred following the consolidation of the municipal and superior courts due to Proposition 220 (1998). The following judicial officers have been appointed to serve on the Superior Court of California, Solano County:

Judges 
Arranged by appointment year, then alphabetically if applicable

 Robert Bowers (2003–present)
 D. Scott Daniels (2005–present)
 Wendy G. Getty (2006–present)
 Donna L. Stashyn (Commissioner: 2005–2007; Judge: 2007-present)
 Alesia F. Jones (2008–present)
 E. (Earl) Bradley Nelson (Commissioner: 2007–2008; Judge: 2008-present)
Tim P. Kam (2010–present)
John B. Ellis (2011–present)
Dan J. Healy (2011–present)
 Christine A. Carringer (2013–present)
Carlos R. Gutierrez (2016–present)
William J. Pendergast III (Commissioner: 2011–2017; Judge: 2017-present)
Dora M. Rios (2017–present) [Solano County's first Latina judge]
 Shauna L. Chastain (2018–present)
 Jeffrey C. Kauffman (2018–present)
Terrye D. Davis (Judge Pro Tem: 2009–2014; Judge: 2019-)
 Stephen Gizzi (2019–)
 Stephanie Grogan Jones (2019–)
Janice M. Williams (2021–)
Christine N. Donovan (2021–)
Amyra Cobb-Hampton (2022– )

Commissioners  
Arranged by appointment year

 David L. Haet (1989–present) [Solano County’s first superior court commissioner]
Robert Q. Warshawsky (2017–present)
Bryan John Kim (2019–)

Presiding Judges (2000–present) 
According to California Rules of Court 10.602 and 10.603, the Presiding Judge is chosen by their peers and "elected for an initial term of not less than two years" if the court has three or more judges. With the assistance of the Court Executive Officer, the Presiding Judge's main objectives are to lead the court, establish policies, and allocate resources in order to ensure that the public has access to justice. Since 2000, the following judicial officers have been appointed as the Presiding Judge for Solano County Superior Court:

William C. Harrison (2000–2001)
Scott Kays (2002–2003)
 Peter B. Foor (2004–2005)
 David Edwin Power (2006–2007)
 Ramona J. Garrett (2008–2009)
D. Scott Daniels (2010–2011)
 Paul L. Beeman (2012–2013)
 E. (Earl) Bradley Nelson (2014–2015)
 Robert Fracchia (2016–2017)
 John B. Ellis (2018–2019)
 Donna L. Stashyn (2020–2021)
Robert S. Bowers (2022)
Wendy G. Getty (2022-2023)

Judicial Officers (Past) 
The following judicial officers served on the Superior Court of California, Solano County:

Arranged by years of service

Judges  

 Abraham J. Buckles (1885–1905; 1908–1915) [Solano’s first superior court judge]
Lewis G. Harrier (1905–1909)
 Frank R. Devlin (1909)
W. T. O'Donnell (1915–1944)
Joseph M. Raines (1945–1955)
Harlow V. Greenwood (1945–1961)
Raymond J. Sherwin (1956–1977)
Phillip B. Lynch (1961–1963)
Thomas N. Healy (1961–1983)
Ellis R. Randall (1966–1986)
John DeRonde (1970–1991)
Victor M. Castagnetto (1971–1978)
William E. Jensen (Municipal court judge: 1961–1979; Superior Court Judge: 1979-1986)
Michael L. McInnis (1979–1991)
 F.  (Frederick) Paul Dacey (1979–2000)
Dwight C. Ely (1980–2000)
Luis M. Villarreal (1982–2005) [Solano County's first Latino judge]
Richard "Mack" Harris (1983–1998)
 Franklin R. Taft (1985–2003)
James F. Moelk (1986–2003)
 J. (John) Clinton Peterson (1986–1998)
 Dennis W. Bunting (1987–1994)
David Edwin Power (1990–2015)
 William C. Harrison (1991–2010)
 Ramona Garrett (1992–2015) [Solano County's first appointed female judge and African American judge]
 Michael E. Nail (1993–2007)
 Harry S. Kinnicutt (1994–2018)
 Eric “Rick” Raymond Uldall (Northern Solano Municipal Court: 1984–1996; Superior Court Judge: 1996-2002)
Ramona J. Garrett (1997–2015)
Scott Kays (1997–2017)
 Peter B. Foor (1997–2018)
R. Michael Smith (Northern Solano Municipal Court Judge: c. 1986–1998; Superior Court Judge: c. 1998-2007)
Allan P. Carter (1998–2011)
Garry T. Ichikawa (2000–2017)
Paul L. Beeman (2000–2018)
Cynda R. Unger (2000–2018) [Solano County's first elected female judge]
Michael C. Mattice (2003–2020)
Robert C. Fracchia (Commissioner: 2005–2008; Judge: 2008-2020)

Commissioners  

 Barbara James (1989–2011) [Solano County's first female magistrate]
J. Paul Coan (1994–2005)
Alberta Chew (1994–2008)
Raymond C. Wieser Jr. (1998–2019)

See also 
 California superior courts

References

External links 
 Superior Court of California, County of Solano County

Solano